Short's Hotel, also known as the Palace Hotel, is a historic hotel located at North East, Erie County, Pennsylvania.  It was built in 1877, and is a three-story, five bay by nine bay, brick building in the Italianate style.  It features double-hung windows with semi-circular or segmental arch heads and a three-part entablature at the top of the building.

It was added to the National Register of Historic Places in 1983.

References

Hotel buildings on the National Register of Historic Places in Pennsylvania
Italianate architecture in Pennsylvania
Hotel buildings completed in 1877
Buildings and structures in Erie County, Pennsylvania
National Register of Historic Places in Erie County, Pennsylvania
1877 establishments in Pennsylvania